TRON: Solar Sailer is a game that was released by Mattel for Intellivision in 1982. The game is one of four released for the console that required the Intellivoice module (the other three were Space Spartans, B-17 Bomber and Bomb Squad).

Gameplay
The game begins by giving the player a code. The player then progresses to a grid-like area with spiders and tanks, which hinder the player with melee and ranged attacks. Although the player can shoot these enemies, doing so quickly drains the enemies' energy. Therefore, avoiding contact and dodging shots is often the most efficient way of navigating the grid. After reaching the correct sector, the player may enter the code to move on.

Bibliography

 Videogaming and Computer Gaming Illustrated, July 1983, p. 35
 Electronic Fun with Computers & Games, July 1983, pp. 58–59
 Videogiochi, Oct 1984, pp. 66–68
 TV Gamer, March 1984, p. 56
 Joystick, May 1984, p. 12

External links
 TRON Solar Sailer at Blue Sky Rangers

Action video games
Intellivision games
Intellivision-only games
1982 video games
Solar Sailer
Mattel video games
Video games developed in the United States